TV to Go is a British television sketch show that aired on BBC One during 2001 and 2002. It starred Mackenzie Crook, Hugh Dennis, Mina Anwar and Debra Stephenson.

Notes and references
TV to Go at BBC Online

2001 British television series debuts
2002 British television series endings
2000s British television sketch shows
BBC television sketch shows